Tom Penn is an American sports executive who is no longer the president and co-owner of Major League Soccer's Los Angeles Football Club.

Penn is also an NBA TV analyst, former NBA executive and co-founder of the Sports Leadership Institute.

Los Angeles Football Club

The Los Angeles Football Club is a Major League Soccer (MLS) team based in downtown Los Angeles. Along with Penn, owners include Henry Nguyen, Peter Guber, Magic Johnson, Nomar Garciaparra, Mia Hamm, Tony Robbins, and Will Ferrell. The team was announced in October 2014 and planned to play its first game in 2018.

ESPN analyst

As an NBA analyst, Penn is regularly featured as a basketball operations expert on advanced analytics, salary cap issues, the NBA Draft, player trades and collective bargaining issues.

Penn started working with ESPN during the 2010 NBA Draft, and during the free agency period of 2010, he operated ESPN's cap machine on SportsCenter, where he manipulated a touchscreen to show potential destinations for LeBron James and other marquee free agents.  Penn has also been on ESPN using the ESPN Trade Machine to break down NBA trades. He left ESPN in 2018 to join Turner Sports.

NBA executive
In 2012, Penn was widely reported as being close to accepting a position as general manager of the Philadelphia 76ers.  He instead re-signed with ESPN. From 2007 to 2010, he spent four seasons with the Portland Trail Blazers as vice president of Basketball Operations and assistant general manager. Penn is an expert on the NBA salary cap and collective bargaining agreement. Penn worked with general manager Kevin Pritchard as they restored the Blazers from the "Jail Blazers" era. The Blazers won 54 games in 2008–09 and again reached 50 wins in 2009–10 in spite of injuries to key players. During the summer of 2009, Penn was offered the general manager job with the Minnesota Timberwolves, but he turned it down, deciding to stay with the Blazers after a promotion to vice president of Basketball Operations. Ten months later, Penn was fired after in what one writer called a "drive by" shooting. On June 24, 2010, the day of the NBA Draft, Kevin Pritchard was also fired by the Blazers.

Penn worked with the Vancouver/Memphis Grizzlies as assistant general manager and legal counsel from 2000 to 2007. For five of those seasons in Memphis, he worked closely with Jerry West and Chuck Daly. The Grizzlies made the playoffs three straight seasons but never advanced passed the first round. In 1999, Penn worked as part of prospective NBA owner Michael Heisley's NBA acquisition team. Penn worked with Dick Versace and Heisley's team to help guide Heisley through the NBA acquisition process until Heisley ultimately purchased the Vancouver Grizzlies in May 2000. After one season in Vancouver, Heisley moved the team to Memphis.

Sports Leadership Institute
The Sports Leadership Institute is a company that organizes private leadership summits for global sports owners, pro sports executives, major college Ads, and professional athletes. Penn founded the company in 2011, and they organize the Global Sports Summit in Aspen, Global Sports Management Summit in Chicago and Collegiate Sports Summit in Santa Monica.

Agent and lawyer
Penn was a lawyer and a player agent. He worked mostly as a criminal defense attorney and acted in 20-plus cases including murder, armed robbery and other serious felony cases. He also was a basketball player agent and organized tours of Europe with free agent players. Upper Deck Company—the trading card company—was his sponsor for the tours and the team was called the "Upper Deck All-Stars". Fox Sports Chicago filmed a documentary movie about one of the tours called Over There.

St. Jude Children's Research Hospital
Penn has been a member of the Board of Governors of St. Jude Children's Research Hospital since 2002. He helped found for St. Jude—an NBA Cares program that raises awareness and funds to fight childhood cancer. For the 2010-11 NBA Season, Hoops for St. Jude features the endorsement of NBA stars Dwyane Wade, Dwight Howard, Pau Gasol, Kevin Love, Rudy Gay, David Lee, Steve Blake, and coach George Karl. Penn serves on the board of directors of the Children's Cancer Association, a Portland-based charity that provides services and programs to children and families who are traumatized by cancer and other diseases.

References

American television hosts
Living people
American sports executives and administrators
Sports owners
Major League Soccer owners
Year of birth missing (living people)